The year 2007 is the ninth year in the history of King of the Cage, a mixed martial arts promotion based in the United States. In 2007 King of the Cage held 24 events, KOTC: Hard Knocks.

Title fights

Events list

KOTC: Hard Knocks

KOTC: Hard Knocks was an event held on January 19, 2007 at The Rockford MetroCentre in Rockford, Illinois.

Results

KOTC: Mass Destruction

KOTC: Mass Destruction was an event held on January 26, 2007 at The Soaring Eagle Casino in Mount Pleasant, Michigan.

Results

KOTC: Caged Chaos

KOTC: Caged Chaos was an event held on March 10, 2007 at The Avi Resort & Casino in Laughlin, Nevada.

Results

KOTC: Sinister

KOTC: Sinister was an event held on April 27, 2007 at The Soboba Casino in San Jacinto, California.

Results

KOTC: Eclipse

KOTC: Eclipse was an event held on May 26, 2007 at The Apache Gold Casino in Globe, Arizona.

Results

KOTC: Damage Control

KOTC: Damage Control was an event held on May 26, 2007 at The UIC Pavilion in Chicago.

Results

KOTC: Eliminator

KOTC: Eliminator was an event held on June 2, 2007 at The Kiowa Casino in Oklahoma.

Results

KOTC: Epicenter

KOTC: Epicenter was an event held on June 8, 2007 at The Soboba Casino in San Jacinto, California.

Results

KOTC: Reincarnated

KOTC: Reincarnated was an event held on June 9, 2007 at Auburn RSL in Auburn, Sydney, Australia.

Results

KOTC: Explosion

KOTC: Explosion was an event held on June 15, 2007 at The Soaring Eagle Casino in Mt. Pleasant, MI.

Results

KOTC: No Holds Barred

KOTC: No Holds Barred was an event held on July 14, 2007 at The Eagle Mountain Casino in Porterville, California.

Results

KOTC: Battle at the Bowl

KOTC: Battle at the Bowl was an event held on July 21, 2007 at The Lake of the Torches in Lac du Flambeau, Wisconsin.

Results

KOTC: Collision Course

KOTC: Collision Course was an event held on August 5, 2007 at The Soboba Casino in San Jacinto, California.

Results

KOTC: River Rage

KOTC: River Rage was an event held on September 15, 2007 in Laughlin, Nevada.

Results

KOTC: Unstoppable

KOTC: Unstoppable was an event held on September 15, 2007 at The Apache Gold Casino in Globe, Arizona.

Results

KOTC: Jawbreaker

KOTC: Jawbreaker was an event held on September 29, 2007 in Oklahoma.

Results

KOTC: Perth

KOTC: Perth was an event held on October 5, 2007 in Perth, Australia.

Results

KOTC: Brimstone

KOTC: Brimstone was an event held on October 6, 2007 in Wisconsin.

Results

KOTC: Point of No Return

KOTC: Point of No Return was an event held on October 7, 2007 in San Jacinto, California.

Results

KOTC: Hierarchy

KOTC: Hierarchy was an event held on October 13, 2007 at The Isleta Casino & Resort in Albuquerque, New Mexico.

Results

KOTC: Arch Rivals

KOTC: Arch Rivals was an event held on October 27, 2007 at The Reno Events Center in Reno, Nevada.

Results

KOTC: Damage Inc.

KOTC: Damage Inc. was an event held on November 17, 2007 at The Rockford MetroCentre in Rockford, Illinois.

Results

KOTC: Bad Boys

KOTC: Bad Boys was an event held on November 21, 2007 at The Soaring Eagle Casino in Mt. Pleasant, MI.

Results

KOTC: Final Chapter

KOTC: Final Chapter was an event held on December 2, 2007 in California.

Results

See also 
 List of King of the Cage events
 List of King of the Cage champions

References

King of the Cage events
2007 in mixed martial arts